Daniel López Pinedo (born 16 July 1980 in Barcelona) is a Spanish water polo goalkeeper who competed for the Spain men's national water polo team in two Summer Olympics (2012 London and 2016 Rio. He helped Spanish water polo club CN Atlètic-Barceloneta win the LEN Champions League in 2013–14 season. He is 6 ft 3 inches tall.

Honours

Club 
Atlètic-Barceloneta
LEN Champions League: 2013–14
LEN Super Cup: 2014
Spanish Championship: 2008–09, 2009–10, 2010–11, 2011–12, 2012–13, 2013–14, 2014–15, 2015–16, 2016–17, 2017–18, 2018–19, 2019–20, 2020–21, 2021–22
Copa del Rey: 2008–09, 2009–10, 2012–13, 2013–14, 2014–15, 2015–16, 2016–17, 2017–18, 2018–19, 2019–20, 2020–21, 2021–22
Supercopa de España: 2009, 2010, 2011, 2013, 2015, 2016, 2017, 2018, 2019
Copa de Cataluña: 2008–09, 2009–10, 2010–11, 2012–13, 2013–14, 2014–15, 2016–17

Awards 
All-Tournament Team of the 2019 World Championship
Second Top European Player in the World by LEN: 2018, 2019
Member of the World Team 2018 by total-waterpolo
Best Goalkeeper of 2009–10, 2011–12,  2014–15, 2015–16, 2016–17, 2017–18, 2018–19 Spanish Championship with Atlètic-Barceloneta
Best Goalkeeper of 2018 European Championship
Best Goalkeeper of 2020 European Championship
Best Goalkeeper of 2019 World Championship
All-Tournament Team of the 2019 World Championship

See also
 Spain men's Olympic water polo team records and statistics
 List of men's Olympic water polo tournament goalkeepers
 List of World Aquatics Championships medalists in water polo

References

External links
 

1980 births
Living people
Water polo players from Catalonia
Spanish male water polo players
Water polo goalkeepers
Olympic water polo players of Spain
Water polo players at the 2012 Summer Olympics
Water polo players at the 2016 Summer Olympics
World Aquatics Championships medalists in water polo
Mediterranean Games silver medalists for Spain
Mediterranean Games medalists in water polo
Competitors at the 2013 Mediterranean Games
Water polo players at the 2020 Summer Olympics
21st-century Spanish people